This is a list of lighthouses in South Korea.

Lighthouses

See also
 Lists of lighthouses and lightvessels

References

External links

 

South Korea
Lighthouses
 
Lighthouses